George W. Cutter (born 1849, date of death unknown) was a United States Navy sailor and a recipient of the United States military's highest decoration, the Medal of Honor.

Biography
Born in Philadelphia, Pennsylvania, in 1849, Cutter joined the Navy from that state  in 1868. On that day, while the ship was at Norfolk, Virginia, Seaman James Mitchell fell from Powhatan's rigging and landed in the water; he was rendered helpless in the fall. Cutter and two others, Second Assistant Engineer George Cowie and Ordinary Seaman Henry Couch, jumped overboard and saved Mitchell from drowning. For this action, Cutter was awarded the Medal of Honor a month and a half later, on July 9.

Cutter's official Medal of Honor citation reads:
On board the U.S.S. Powhatan, Norfolk, Va., 27 May 1872. Jumping overboard on this date, Cutter aided in saving one of the crew of that vessel from drowning.

See also

List of Medal of Honor recipients during peacetime

References

External links
 
 

1849 births
Year of death missing
Military personnel from Philadelphia
United States Navy sailors
United States Navy Medal of Honor recipients
Non-combat recipients of the Medal of Honor